Bossip is an online gossip and entertainment magazine with a focus on African American celebrities. The site is owned by iOne Digital, an Urban One Inc. company. The magazine is based in Atlanta, Georgia.

Bossip has interviewed celebrities such as Kanye West, Janet Jackson, Sanaa Lathan, Russell Simmons, Damon Dash and Kim Kardashian. The website is known for its humorous headlines.

Awards

In October 2006, Bossip published its first annual Style Awards with Diddy getting the title as best dressed African-American celebrity and Serena Williams as worst dressed.

Two months later in December, Bossip published a new "award" for most annoying celebrity of 2006 with singer and actress Beyoncé as 1st position, actor Taye Diggs at 10th position and rapper Kanye West with an honorable mention.

References

External links 

Bossip
New York Daily News, Bossip Mention
Bossip Exclusive: Rudy from Cosby Show on Cocaine 
Bossips 2006 Style Awards: Serena Williams Worst Dressed, Diddy Best Dressed 
Flavor Flav's Ladies--It's ON!, TMZ
Bloggers shed light on lives of black celebs, Winston-Salem Journal

African-American mass media
American entertainment news websites
Internet properties established in 2006